Raymond Frederick "Ray" Streater  (born 1936) is a British physicist, and professor emeritus of Applied Mathematics at King's College London.  He is best known for co-authoring a text on quantum field theory, the 1964 PCT, Spin and Statistics and All That.

Life 

Ray Streater was born on 21 April 1936 in Three Bridges in the parish of Worth, Sussex, England, United Kingdom, the second son of Frederick Arthur Streater (builder) (1905-1965) and Dorothy Beatrice Streater, née Thomas (17 December 1907 - 16 December 1994). He married Mary Patricia née Palmer on 19 September 1962, and they had three children: Alexander Paul (1963); Stephen Bernard (1965); Catherine Jane Mary (1967).

Professor Streater's career may be summarised as follows.

 Jan.-Sep. 1960 – Research Fellow, CERN, Geneva, Switzerland
 1960-1961 – Instructor in Physics, Princeton University, NJ, USA
 1961-1964 – Assistant Lecturer in Physics, Imperial College, London
 1964-1967 – Lecturer in Physics, Imperial College, London
 1967-1969 – Senior Lecturer in Mathematics, Imperial College, London
 1969-1984 – Professor of Applied Mathematics, Bedford College, London
 1984-2001 – Professor of Applied Mathematics, King's College London
 Oct. 2001 on – Emeritus Professor, King's College London

Works 

Streater co-authored a classic text on mathematical quantum field theory, reprinted as

 PCT, Spin and Statistics and All That (written jointly with Wightman, A. S.), 2000, Princeton University Press, Landmarks in Mathematics and Physics ( paperback); first published in 1964 by W. A. Benjamin.  The title is an homage to 1066 and All That.

He has also become interested in the dynamics of quantum systems that are not in a pure state, but are large. This is expressed in

 Statistical Dynamics: A Stochastic Approach to Nonequilibrium Thermodynamics, 1995, Imperial College Press ( hardback,  paperback). This work was simplified and extended in the second edition, published in 2009.

References

External links
 Professor Streater's page at King's College, London

1936 births
Living people
People from Worth, West Sussex
British physicists
Academics of Imperial College London
Academics of King's College London
Princeton University faculty
Quantum physicists
People associated with CERN